The West Side of Manhattan in New York City experienced a power failure on July 13, 2019, at approximately 7 p.m. EDT. Con Edison is the energy utility serving the area, and they reported that approximately 73,000 customers were without power. Power was fully restored by midnight. The power failure occurred on the 42nd anniversary of the New York City blackout of 1977, which left nine million customers without power.

Effects
The power outage commenced around 6:47 p.m. EDT, leaving 73,000 customers in Manhattan's West Side without power for about three hours. It affected six power sectors and encompassed an approximately 30-block area in Midtown Manhattan and the Upper West Side, from Times Square to 72nd Street, and from Fifth Avenue to the Hudson River. 

The Metropolitan Transportation Authority (MTA) reported that the entire New York City Subway system was affected by the outage. Some subway complexes were without lights, and service was affected on several routes. All of the subway's numbered routes suffered extensive delays. Limited service was available on the IRT Broadway–Seventh Avenue Line (1, 2, and 3 trains) on Manhattan's west side; the IRT Lexington Avenue Line (4, 5, and 6 trains) on Manhattan's east side; and on the IRT Flushing Line (7 train) from Manhattan to Queens. The MTA advised passengers to take buses instead in Manhattan.

Areas affected by the outage included Times Square, Rockefeller Center, Radio City Music Hall, and Broadway theatres. Most theaters on Broadway cancelled their shows for the evening; of the 30 shows running at the time, only the four playing on the east side of Broadway were able to perform. Performances at Carnegie Hall and Lincoln Center were also cancelled. However, some performers from the canceled shows entertained audiences on the sidewalks outside the theaters. The blackout also canceled a Jennifer Lopez concert at Madison Square Garden.

Firefighters worked to free numerous people trapped in elevators; about 750 of the 1,000 calls which the FDNY responded to were from those seeking assistance regarding elevators or fire alarms. Drivers were stuck in a traffic jam on the West Side Highway when the streetlights went out. According to New York City Department of Transportation, over 200 traffic lights stopped functioning. Civilians and police officers helped to direct traffic. The roads were temporarily closed between 2nd Street and 71st Street between Fifth Avenue and the Hudson River in both directions. Police directed traffic in some areas, while at other locations such as Hell's Kitchen, pedestrians took on the task. New York Governor Andrew Cuomo brought in the New York National Guard to assist with traffic problems and safety issues.

Causes
The outage was initially reported as being possibly due to a manhole explosion; the existence of the explosion was verified by New York State Assemblywoman Linda Rosenthal. The New York City Fire Department, the New York City Police Department, and the NYC Emergency Management agency were dispatched to 65th Street and West End Avenue in response to the incident.

In the early stages of the incident, Con Edison attributed the outage to a mechanical failure that it felt could be resolved relatively quickly, but did not give an estimate on when power would be restored. According to the New York City Fire Department, the blackout was caused by a transformer fire at West 64th Street and West End Avenue.

However, Con Edison later said that the power failure originated at a substation on West 49th Street. Gov. Cuomo further specified that an explosion and resulting fire at the substation caused damage to other substations. New York Mayor Bill de Blasio initially said via Twitter that a "manhole fire" was the cause, though he later stated that the outage was due to a transformer fire, and that no foul play was suspected.

John McAvoy, Con Edison's chairman and CEO, said that although mechanical failure was likely the cause of the outage, a full investigation would be required for a definitive answer. McAvoy further stated that "excessive load" due to summertime energy demand was not likely a contributing factor to the blackout.

Restoration of service
At around 10:00 p.m. EDT, July 13, 2019, power was partially restored to Times Square and Hell's Kitchen. By 10:30 p.m., five of the six electric networks were restored. Shortly before midnight, power was fully restored to all six sectors.

By 1:30 a.m. on July 14, 2019, multiple lanes between Fifth Avenue and the Hudson River were open. By 2:00 a.m., subway lines through Midtown Manhattan, namely the IND Eighth Avenue Line (A, C, and E trains), IND Sixth Avenue Line (D,  F, and M trains), and the IRT lines (1, 2, 3, 4, 5, 6 and 7 trains), had resumed service in both directions.

Aftermath
No injuries or fatalities were reported during the outage.

Governor Cuomo was critical of the power failure, calling it "unacceptable" due to the breadth of the outages, as well as in light of previous problems with power substations. He called for an investigation by New York's Department of Public Service to identify the cause of the outages, and to "prevent an incident of this magnitude from happening again".

However, Cuomo praised the response of the city's population, saying via Twitter, "When things are at their worst, New Yorkers are at their best, and they were at their best tonight."

See also
 List of major power outages
New York City blackout of 1977 - occurred exactly 42 years before.

References

2019 in New York City
July 2019 events in the United States
Power outages in the United States
2010s in Manhattan